Pompeiopolis was a city in ancient Paphlagonia, now in Turkey.

Pompeiopolis may also refer to:

Pompeiopolis in Cilicia, now in Turkey
Pompeiopolis in Hispania, now in Spain
Pompeiopolis in Pontus, a former name of Samsun, Turkey